Il patto Mussolini, in full: Il patto Mussolini: storia di un piano politico e di un negoziato diplomatico, is a history book by Italian author and historian Francesco Salata, first published in 1933. The book is a "history and analysis of the Four Power Pact, with all the documents," and an "eulogy when praising Mussolini's accomplishments as a diplomat." Apart from the "too much dithyrambic tone," Salata's work is considered fundamental and a "very valuable exegesis."

Overview
The book was published by Mondadori in 1933, one year after the success of Oberdan, the reduced version of Salata's Guglielmo Oberdan secondo gli atti segreti del processo: carteggi diplomatici e altri documenti inediti, originally published by Zanichelli in 1924.

Il patto Mussolini, sometimes credited as Salata's greatest commercial success, is an analysis and history of the Four Power Pact, a non-belligerence treaty that was signed in June 1933 in the Palazzo Venezia in Rome by France, the United Kingdom, Germany, and Italy. In the book, "Salata, an expert of history studies, as part of a book of diplomatic review," highly praises Mussolini and his accomplishments as a diplomat.

Notwithstanding the perhaps excessive celebration of Mussolini, the work is considered fundamental, and an important exegesis.

References

Italian books
Essays
History books about international relations
History books about interwar Europe
History books about Italy
Non-fiction books about diplomacy
1933 books
Arnoldo Mondadori Editore books